The robust duneslider (Lerista ips)  is a species of skink found in the Northern Territory and Western Australia.

References

Lerista
Reptiles described in 1980
Taxa named by Glen Milton Storr